The 188th New York State Legislature, consisting of the New York State Senate and the New York State Assembly, met from January 4, 1989, to December 31, 1990, during the seventh and eighth years of Mario Cuomo's governorship, in Albany.

Background
Under the provisions of the New York Constitution of 1938 and the U.S. Supreme Court decision to follow the One man, one vote rule, re-apportioned in 1982 by the Legislature, 61 Senators and 150 assemblymen were elected in single-seat districts for two-year terms. Senate and Assembly districts consisted of approximately the same number of inhabitants, the area being apportioned contiguously without restrictions regarding county boundaries.

At this time there were two major political parties: the Democratic Party and the Republican Party. The Liberal Party, the Conservative Party, the Right to Life Party, an "Independent Progressive Party", the Workers World Party, the Libertarian Party, and the Socialist Workers Party also nominated tickets.

Elections
The New York state election, 1988, was held on November 8. The only statewide elective office up for election was a U.S. Senator from New York. Democrat Daniel Patrick Moynihan was re-elected with Liberal endorsement. The approximate party strength at this election, as expressed by the vote for U.S. Senator, was: Democrats/Liberals 4,049,000; Republicans/Conservatives 1,876,000; Right to Life 65,000; Independent Progressives 15,000; Workers World 13,500; Libertarians 12,000; and Socialist Workers 11,000.

All sitting 22 women members of the legislature—State Senators Mary B. Goodhue (Rep.), a lawyer of Mount Kisco; Nancy Larraine Hoffmann (Dem.), of Syracuse; Olga A. Méndez (Dem.), of East Harlem; Velmanette Montgomery (Dem.), of Brooklyn; and Suzi Oppenheimer (Dem.), of Mamaroneck; and Assemblywomen Barbara M. Clark (Dem.), of Queens; Elizabeth Connelly (Dem.), of Staten Island; Pinny Cooke (Rep.), of Rochester; Geraldine L. Daniels (Dem.), of the Bronx; Gloria Davis (Dem.), of the Bronx; Eileen C. Dugan (Dem.), of Brooklyn; Aurelia Greene (Dem.), of the Bronx; Earlene Hill Hooper (Dem.), of Hempstead; Rhoda S. Jacobs (Dem.), of Brooklyn; Cynthia Jenkins (Dem.), a librarian of Queens; Helen M. Marshall (Dem.), a teacher and librarian of Queens; Nettie Mayersohn (Dem.), of Queens; Patricia McGee (Rep.), of Franklinville; Mary M. McPhillips (Dem.), of Middletown; Catherine Nolan (Dem.), of Queens; Audrey Pheffer (Dem.), of Queens; and Helene Weinstein (Dem.), a lawyer of Brooklyn—were re-elected. Ada L. Smith (Dem.), of Queens, was also elected to the State Senate. Cecile D. Singer (Rep.), of Yonkers, was also elected to the Assembly.

The New York state election, 1989, was held on November 7. Two vacancies in the State Senate were filled. Assemblywoman Mary M. McPhillips was elected as County Executive of Orange County.

Sessions
The Legislature met for the first regular session (the 212th) at the State Capitol in Albany on January 4, 1989; and recessed indefinitely on July 1.

Mel Miller (Dem.) was re-elected Speaker of the Assembly.

Ralph J. Marino (Rep.) was elected Temporary President of the Senate.

The Legislature met for the second regular session (the 213th) at the State Capitol in Albany on January 3, 1990; and recessed indefinitely on July 2.

The legislature met again from December 3 to 14, 1990. This session was called to consider state budget cuts, an increase in CUNY's tuition rates, and an anti-crime plan proposed by Mayor of New York City David Dinkins.

State Senate

Senators
The asterisk (*) denotes members of the previous Legislature who continued in office as members of this Legislature. John B. Sheffer II changed from the Assembly to the Senate at the beginning of the session. Assemblyman Kemp Hannon was elected to fill a vacancy in the Senate.

Note: For brevity, the chairmanships omit the words "...the Committee on (the)..."

Employees
 Secretary: Stephen F. Sloan

State Assembly

Assemblymen
The asterisk (*) denotes members of the previous Legislature who continued in office as members of this Legislature.

Note: For brevity, the chairmanships omit the words "...the Committee on (the)..."

Employees
 Clerk: Francine Misasi

Notes

Sources
 New York State's Democrats Bask in Glow of Strong Showing in The New York Times on November 10, 1988
 THE ELECTIONS; New York State Senate in The New York Times on November 10, 1988
 Marchi, After 16 Years, Loses Post On Finance Panel in Senate Shifts by Elizabeth Colbert, in The New York Times on January 10, 1989
 The Legislature in The Public Sector (Vol. 12, No. 3, issue of February 6, 1989; pg. 19)
 Special Assembly Elections Set in The Daily Gazette, of Schenectady, on January 18, 1990 (pg. B 7)

188
1989 establishments in New York (state)
1990 disestablishments in New York (state)
1989 politics in New York (state)
1990 politics in New York (state)
1989 U.S. legislative sessions
1990 U.S. legislative sessions